The 1928 International Lawn Tennis Challenge was the 23rd edition of what is now known as the Davis Cup. 27 teams would enter the Europe Zone, while six would enter the America Zone. Chile, Finland, and Norway made their first appearances in the competition.

The United States defeated Italy in the Inter-Zonal play-off, but would lose to France in the Challenge Round, giving France their second straight title. The final was played at the new Stade Roland Garros in Paris, France on 27–29 July.

America Zone

Draw

Final
United States vs. Japan

Europe Zone

Draw

Final
Italy vs. Czechoslovakia

Inter-Zonal Final
United States vs. Italy

Challenge Round
France vs. United States

See also
 1928 Wightman Cup

References

External links
Davis Cup official website

Davis Cups by year
 
International Lawn Tennis Challenge
International Lawn Tennis Challenge
International Lawn Tennis Challenge
International Lawn Tennis Challenge